Not Too Late may refer to:

Not Too Late (album), a 2007 album by Norah Jones
"Not Too Late" (Norah Jones song), 2007 
"Not Too Late" (Ricki-Lee Coulter song), 2017

See also
It's Not Too Late